The men's 400 metres event at the 1983 Pan American Games was held in Caracas, Venezuela on 26 and 27 August.

Medalists

Results

Heats

Final

References

Athletics at the 1983 Pan American Games
1983